Arthur Dix Marshall  (5 August 1934 – 7 June 2018) was an Australian politician and sportsman from Western Australia.

Biography
Marshall was born in East Fremantle in 1934 to Horrie and Eunice Marshall. He was educated at Palmyra Primary School, Fremantle Boys High School, and Wesley College, Perth, where he was a house captain and prefect. He had three children with his wife Helen, including Dixie Marshall, a local television newsreader. Marshall died from bone cancer  on 7 June 2018.

Sporting career
Marshall played Australian rules football for East Fremantle Football Club in the Western Australian National Football League (WANFL). Between 1954 and 1961 played 20 league for East Fremantle.

In 1955 and 1956 he entered the Wimbledon Championships, losing in the first and third rounds respectively.

In later life Marshall served as a football commentator with the Seven Network, and established the Arthur Marshall Tennis Academy in 1958.

Politics
Marshall first contested a seat at the 1990 Fremantle state by-election as a Liberal candidate. He achieved 35.70% of the vote against Labor candidate Jim McGinty's 33.75%, but lost after the distribution of preferences. He won the seat of Murray in the 1993 election, succeeding Keith Read.  A redistribution in 1994 saw the seat abolished and he was elected to the new seat of Dawesville at the 1996 election. He was re-elected in 2001 and retired at the 2005 election.

Marshall was awarded the Medal of the Order of Australia (OAM) in the 2006 Australia Day Honours for "service to the community through fundraising for a range of not-for-profit organisations, to sport, and to the Parliament of Western Australia".

References

External links
 Mr Arthur Dix Marshall from the 'Western Australian Parliamentary Handbook'

1934 births
2018 deaths
Australian rules football commentators
Australian rules footballers from Fremantle
Australian male tennis players
East Fremantle Football Club players
Members of the Western Australian Legislative Assembly
Politicians from Perth, Western Australia
People educated at Wesley College, Perth
Liberal Party of Australia members of the Parliament of Western Australia
Australian sportsperson-politicians
21st-century Australian politicians
Tennis players from Perth, Western Australia
Recipients of the Medal of the Order of Australia